Paul Barham (born 29 April 1989 from Basildon, Essex) is a former English professional darts player who played in the Professional Darts Corporation (PDC) events.

Career
Barham won three PDC Youth Tour events in 2011, and finished second in the Youth Tour Order of Merit. He reached the semi-finals of the 2012 PDC World Youth Championship, where he lost to James Hubbard.

Barham qualified for the 2012 PDC World Darts Championship as the Youth Tour Order of Merit runner-up. He lost in the preliminary round 2–4 against Hong Kong's Scott MacKenzie. On the PDC Pro Tour in 2012 Barham could only reach the last 64 once out of all the events he played.

Barham failed to qualify for the 2013 UK Open as he finished 142nd on the Order of Merit, outside of the top 96 who claimed their places. He did qualify for two European Tour events during the year but lost in the first round in both. Barham began 2014 ranked world number 148. He played in all four days of Q School but couldn't win past the last 128 and only entered two European Qualifiers during the year, failing to reach the main event in both. Barham reached the final of the 2015 BDO Gold Cup, where he lost 3–0 to Brian Dawson. He played in the first eight Challenge Tour events of 2016 and got to the last 32 once.
In 2017, Paul was one of the Rileys Sports Bar UK Open Qualifiers and made it to the Last 64 Losing to Ian White 10-2.

Barham left on the PDC in July 2018.

World Championship results

PDC
 2012: Preliminary round (lost to Scott MacKenzie 2–4) (legs)

Personal life
Barham is a former student at James Hornsby High School.

References

External links

Official website - http://paulbarhamdarts.co.uk/

1989 births
Living people
English darts players
Sportspeople from Basildon
Professional Darts Corporation former pro tour players